Esophyllas is a genus of North American dwarf spiders that was first described by T. R. Prentice & R. A. Redak in 2012.  it contains only two species, both found in the United States: E. synankylis and E. vetteri.

See also
 List of Linyphiidae species (A–H)

References

Araneomorphae genera
Linyphiidae
Spiders of the United States